The Speedway Grand Prix of Scandinavia is a speedway event that is a part of the Speedway Grand Prix Series.

Winners

Most wins
 Leigh Adams 3 times

See also
List of sporting events in Sweden
Speedway Grand Prix of Sweden

References

See also
List of sporting events in Sweden

 
Grand Prix of Scandinavia
Sport in Scandinavia
Scandinavia